The Office for Safeguarding National Security of the Central People's Government of the People's Republic of China in the Hong Kong Special Administrative Region (Abbreviation: CPGNSO) is a state security agency established by the Hong Kong national security law. 

The office is headed by director Zheng Yanxiong and entirely staffed by mainland officials. The office is a part of and funded by the Central People's Government (State Council) of China and is not subject to Hong Kong jurisdiction. It is officially under the list of agencies that are dispatched by the Central Committee of the Chinese Communist Party.

History

The CPGNSO was established on 1 July 2020 as a result of the promulgation of the Hong Kong national security law. The law was, in contrast with the regular legislative process of the region, not passed by the local Legislative Council, but by the Standing Committee of the National People's Congress in Beijing. On 3 July 2020 the State Council appointed Zheng Yanxiong as director of the organisation, and Li Jiangzhou and Sun Qingye as deputy heads.

Following the arrest of 53 pro-democracy figures in January 2021, the Office expressed support for the operation and singled out Benny Tai.

In February 2021, Zheng Zehui and Deng Jianwei were added to the office as bureau chiefs.

Headquarters

On 7 July 2020 the location of the CPGNSO temporary headquarters was announced. The Office, together with its employees' living quarters, is located in the Metropark Hotel Causeway Bay building. The hotel replaced by the CPGNSO was owned by China Travel Service (a tourism agency previously accused of assisting Chinese authorities in doxing local pro-democracy journalists and activists). After the office opened on 8 July 2020, the building's floor plans were removed from publicly accessible records.

On April 19, 2021, the Office announced that it was taking over the Island Pacific Hotel in Sai Ying Pun as an additional work site.

On April 23, 2021, it was announced that a new building for the office's use will be constructed at Tai Kok Tsui at a cost of HKD$8 million.

In November 2022, the CPGNSO bought a 7,171 sqft 5-bedroom mansion in Beacon Hill for HK$508 million.

Legal authority
For the office to be allowed to exercise its jurisdiction on a case, either the office itself or the Government of Hong Kong need to request approval from the Central People's Government (CPG). Statutorily, the office is only to be granted jurisdiction in cases of complexity due to the presence of foreign or external elements, inability of the regional government to enforce the law, or a major and imminent threat to national security. However, the structuring of the approval process effectively means that the CPG can, since it also administers the CPGNSO, grant its organ jurisdiction at its own discretion, without legal interference from Hong Kong regional authorities. The Hong Kong Secretary for Justice has stated that a suspect's right to engage a lawyer registered to practice in Hong Kong, but not in Mainland China, will be determined through the application of Mainland law.

When the CPGNSO has been granted jurisdiction to investigate a case, the Supreme People's Procuratorate decides which body prosecutes the case, and the Supreme People's Court decides which court is to adjudicate it. In these cases, procedural matters are governed by PRC law, including the Criminal Procedure Law. This leads to a lack of judicial independence, the absence of the right to remain silent, the possibility of incommunicado detention, and significant restriction of the right to counsel.

Immunity 

The office and its staff are not subject to Hong Kong jurisdiction. Furthermore, on-duty holders of identification or certification documents issued by the office are immune from inspection, search and detention by Hong Kong law enforcement officers.

Sanctioning of staff by the United States 
The first Office director Zheng Yanxiong was sanctioned by the United States Treasury in August 2020 pursuant to the Normalization Executive Order (Executive Order 13936).
The order, which had been issued by US President Donald Trump on 14 July, had been a response to the imposition of the national security law. Deputy director Li Jiangzhou was sanctioned by the US on 9 November. Deputy director Sun Qingye was sanctioned by the US on 15 January 2021.

See also
National security and Intelligence
Committee for Safeguarding National Security of the Hong Kong Special Administrative Region
National Security Department of the Hong Kong Police
National Security Commission of the Chinese Communist Party
Ministry of State Security (China)
United Front Work Department
Chinese oversight of Hong Kong
Hong Kong Liaison Office of the CPG
Hong Kong Garrison of the PLA
Office of the Commissioner of the Ministry of Foreign Affairs of the People's Republic of China in the Hong Kong Special Administrative Region
Central Leading Group on Hong Kong and Macau Affairs
Hong Kong and Macau Affairs Office
 United Front in Hong Kong

References

Chinese intelligence agencies
2020 establishments in Hong Kong
National security institutions
Law enforcement agencies of Hong Kong
Specialist law enforcement agencies of China
State Council of the People's Republic of China
Hong Kong national security law